Matur Marial Maker (born 1 January 1998) is a South Sudanese-born Australian basketball player who last played for the Canterbury Rams of the New Zealand National Basketball League (NZNBL). He moved to Australia in his childhood and played for various prep schools in Canada and the United States, before forgoing college basketball. He is the younger brother of NBA player Thon Maker and the cousin of basketball player Makur Maker.

Early life 
Maker was born in what is now known as South Sudan on 1 January 1998 with his older brother Thon Maker. In Matur's early childhood, his uncle, a local administrator, helped the family flee to Uganda amid a civil war in their home country. They then settled in Perth, Western Australia as refugees when Maker was four years of age but continued making occasional visits to South Sudan. Matur first started playing soccer at Grayhounds soccer club, a club where many south Sudanese kids played for and alongside his brother Thon. At age 13, Matur was discovered by basketball scout Edward Smith and began living with him in Sydney, before moving to the United States. After his parents were satisfied by the decision, Matur was allowed to join his brother in high school and Smith eventually became their legal guardian.

High school career 
Maker began playing high school basketball as a freshman at Carlisle School in Martinsville, Virginia, where he joined Thon, a sophomore, in the middle of the season. His guardian Edward Smith, who the brothers lived with in a two-story house, was an assistant coach for the team at the time. According to Smith, Matur's arrival at Carlisle helped Thon better acclimate to the United States. During his freshman season, Matur was considered one of the best high school players in the country at the small forward position. He helped Carlisle win a state championship and played with Team Loaded VA of the Amateur Athletic Union (AAU).

For his sophomore year, Maker transferred from Carlisle, with Hopewell Academy in Cary, North Carolina and Orangeville Prep in Orangeville, Ontario as potential destinations. In September 2014, Maker and his brother enrolled at Orangeville Prep, where they played under head coach Larry Blunt and with fellow top prospect Jamal Murray. He was named Ontario Scholastic Basketball Association (OSBA) second-team all-star.

In 2016–17, Maker moved to The Tech Academy in Sault Ste. Marie, Ontario, where he was coached by his guardian Edward Smith and became teammates with cousin Makur Makur. With the Milwaukee Bucks having selected Thon at the 2016 NBA draft, the transfer allowed Matur to live closer to his brother. In April 2017, Maker competed in the BioSteel All-Canadian Basketball Game in Toronto, where he was named most valuable player. In the game, he recorded 25 points and six rebounds, shooting 8-of-11 from the field, playing only 12 minutes. At an adidas Nations event in August, he averaged 26 points and seven rebounds for the Asia Pacific team.

Maker played a postgraduate season of basketball at Mississauga Prep in Mississauga, Ontario for 2017–18. By 2018, he was averaging 25.5 points, 11.3 rebounds, 2.8 assists, 2.1 blocks and 1.7 steals. On 5 January 2018, Maker declared intentions to bypass college and enter the 2018 NBA draft, attempting to follow a similar path as his brother in 2016. He drew attention from scouts on 11 January, when he notched 45 points, 20 rebounds, two blocks, and three steals in a 95–85 defeat to GTA Prep. However, due to a lack of attention on his name during the 2018 NBA Draft process, he withdrew his name from the 2018 NBA draft on the 11 June international deadline.

Professional career

Union Neuchâtel (2018) 
On 7 August 2018, Maker signed with Union Neuchâtel of the Swiss Basketball League. Through 4 appearances, he averaged 5.8 points, 3.8 rebounds, and 0.8 assists in 13.9 minutes per game.

Zlatorog Laško (2018–2019) 
On 30 December 2018, Maker signed with Zlatorog Laško of the Slovenian Basketball League. Maker played 17 games with Zlatorog and averaged 13ppg, 10rpg and lead his team to the playoffs.

Rio Grande Valley Vipers (2019–2020) 
On 19 October 2019, Maker signed with the Houston Rockets of the NBA, but was waived the next day. Following this, Maker was added to the roster of the Rockets' NBA G League affiliate, the Rio Grande Valley Vipers.

Sydney Kings (2021–2022) 
Maker joined the Denver Nuggets for the 2021 NBA Summer League.

On 27 August 2021, Maker signed with the Sydney Kings for the 2021–22 NBL season.

Canterbury Rams (2022) 
In May 2022, Maker played three games with the Canterbury Rams during the 2022 New Zealand NBL season.

References

External links 
Matur Maker at Eurobasket.com
Matur Maker at RealGM

1998 births
Living people
Australian expatriate basketball people in Canada
Australian expatriate basketball people in the United States
Australian expatriate basketball people in Switzerland
Australian men's basketball players
South Sudanese emigrants to Australia
Sportspeople of South Sudanese descent
Basketball players from Perth, Western Australia
Basketball players from Sydney
Canterbury Rams players
Centers (basketball)
Dinka people
South Sudanese expatriate basketball people in Slovenia
South Sudanese expatriate basketball people in Switzerland
KK Zlatorog Laško players
Power forwards (basketball)
Rio Grande Valley Vipers players
South Sudanese expatriate basketball people in the United States
South Sudanese expatriate basketball people in Canada
South Sudanese men's basketball players
Sydney Kings players
Union Neuchâtel Basket players
South Sudanese refugees
Refugees in Uganda
Australian expatriate basketball people in Slovenia
Australian expatriate basketball people in New Zealand